USS Sargo (SS-188), the lead ship of her class of submarine, was the first ship of the United States Navy to be named for the sargo fish.

Construction and commissioning
Sargo′s keel was laid on 12 May 1937 by the Electric Boat Company in Groton, Connecticut. She was launched on 6 June 1938, sponsored by Mrs. Catherine V. Nimitz, the wife of Captain (later Fleet Admiral) Chester W. Nimitz, and commissioned on 7 February 1939.

Sargo batteries

The Sargo was the first vessel equipped with a new lead-acid battery designed by the Bureau of Steam Engineering (BuEng) to resist battle damage, based on a suggestion by her commissioning commanding officer, Lieutenant E. E. Yeomans. It quickly became known as the "Sargo battery". Instead of a single hard rubber case, it had two concentric hard rubber cases with a layer of soft rubber between them. This was to prevent sulfuric acid leakage in the event one case cracked during depth-charging. Leaking sulfuric acid would be capable of corroding steel, burning the skin of crew members it came into contact with, and if mixed with any seawater in the bilges it would generate poisonous chlorine gas. This remained the standard battery design until replaced with Sargo II and GUPPY batteries in submarines upgraded under the Greater Underwater Propulsion Power Program after World War II. Each battery's capacity was slightly increased by installing 126 cells instead of 120; this also raised the nominal voltage from 250 volts to 270 volts, which has been standard in US usage ever since, including the backup batteries of nuclear submarines.

Pre-war service
After shakedown along the eastern seaboard of South America, Sargo departed Portsmouth, New Hampshire, in July 1939 for duty with the Pacific Fleet. Transiting the Panama Canal, she arrived at San Diego, California, in mid-August. She operated in the eastern and mid-Pacific for the next two years, including a practice 40-day war patrol between Midway Island and the Marshall Islands in the fall of 1941. She departed Pearl Harbor on 23 October 1941, arrived in Manila on 10 November, and was there when the Japanese attacked Pearl Harbor on 7 December.

War patrols under Tyrell D. Jacobs
The next day (under the command of the torpedo specialist Lieutenant Commander Tyrell D. Jacobs, Annapolis Class of 1927), This submarine got underway for her first war patrol, one that took her along the east coast of French Indochina and to the Netherlands East Indies. Off the major Japanese base at Cam Ranh Bay, ULTRA intercepts directed her to three cruisers on 14 December, but the Sargo was unable to gain position to attack when they appeared as scheduled. Expecting a convoy, she went in closer, and that night detected a freighter, firing one torpedo; it prematured eighteen seconds later. Confidence in the Mark VI torpedo exploder shaken, she switched to contact pistol afterward.

The next day, she sighted a pair of merchantmen, but was unable to gain firing position. Some time afterward, she came on two more merchantmen and fired two stern torpedoes at the rearmost of them, from closer yet, ; both again missed. By now frustrated, after eight torpedoes with zero results, when two additional merchantmen came in view an hour later, Sargo took extra pains to get it right, pursuing for fifty-seven minutes and making certain TDC bearings matched perfectly before firing two torpedoes at each ship, at an average of 1000 yards; all missed.

After her skipper discovered the torpedoes were running too deep, and correcting the problem, Sargo detected a target at dusk on 26 December losing, then regaining, contact, and running ahead, so be able to get good position. Then weather intervened, and the ships escaped.

A few days afterward, a big, slow tanker gave Sargo another opportunity, and again, the approach was meticulous, firing one torpedo at a close . It missed. In exasperation, Sargo signaled headquarters, questioning the Mark 14's reliability on an open radio circuit.

On 20 January 1942, she assisted in the rescue of the crew of S-36 after she ran aground on Taku Reef in the Makassar Strait. Sargo remained surfaced, relaying distress messages to friendly aircraft and surface ships. After the rescue by the Dutch merchant ship Siberote, Sargo headed for Java, and arrived at Soerabaja on 25 January.

Here, she offloaded all her reload torpedoes (keeping only those in her tubes) and three-inch ammunition, and took on one million rounds of .30-caliber ammunition desperately needed by Allied forces in the Philippines. She sortied 5 February, avoiding the usual traffic lanes, and arrived in Polloc Harbor nine days later. After delivering her vital cargo to Mindanao, she returned to Soerabaja with 24 Boeing B-17 specialists from Clark Field on board.

Sailing from Soerabaja with 31 passengers from Java on 25 February, she headed for Australia. She went out of control and plunged to a depth of  before her crew could stop her dive, then rose rapidly and broached spectacularly. She again submerged, and a second pair of bombs exploded. She remained submerged until after nightfall and arrived safely at Fremantle on 5 March 1942.

War patrols under Richard V. Gregory

During March, amid the panic over potential Japanese invasion of Australia, Sargo (now commanded by Richard V. Gregory, Class of 1932) was detailed to guard Darwin's approaches. Nothing materialized.

On 8 June, Sargo put to sea for her fourth patrol, conducted in the Gulf of Siam off Malaya. She attacked only one target, a small tanker, with only three torpedoes, but failed to score, then returned to Australia on 2 August.

The fifth war patrol, from 27 August to 25 October, was in the Celebes Sea and South China Sea. In a submerged attack off Vietnam, French Indochina, on 25 September, she fired two torpedoes at the 4,472-ton cargo ship Teibo Maru. When these did not sink the target, three more were fired; all missed, including one circular, which exploded off her stern, presaging another deadly failing of the Mark 14. Sargo then surfaced and finished off the crippled freighter with gunfire.

War patrols under Edward S. Carmick

On 29 November, she departed Brisbane and conducted her sixth patrol (now commanded by Edward S. Carmick, Class of 1930) en route to Hawaii. On the last day of 1942, she made a submerged attack on an enemy tanker off Tingmon Island, firing a spread of four torpedoes. Heavy explosions were heard, accompanied by grinding noises usually associated with a ship breaking up. JANAC did not confirm the sinking. She arrived at Pearl Harbor on 21 January 1943 and proceeded to San Francisco Bay for a three-month overhaul in the Mare Island Navy Yard.

Returning to Hawaii on 10 May, she departed on 27 May for her seventh patrol which took her to the Truk-Guam-Saipan shipping lanes. On 13 June, she intercepted a three-ship convoy, escorted by a subchaser. That night, she made a submerged attack, sinking the passenger-cargo ship Konan Maru southeast of Palau. The next day, she fired torpedoes at another of the cargo ships but could not learn the results of her attack, since she was forced to dive to escape the subchaser's depth charges. Sargo arrived at Midway Island on 9 July, where she was credited with one ship sunk for 6,600 tons (reduced postwar to 5,200).

She departed Midway on 1 August for her eighth war patrol, again at Truk and in the Mariana Islands. She made no contacts and returned to Pearl Harbor on 15 September for refit.

War patrols under Philip W. Garnett and post-war fate
On her ninth war patrol (now commanded by Philip W. Garnett, Class of 1933), 15 October to 9 December, Sargo operated off Formosa and in the Philippine Sea. On 9 November, she torpedoed the cargo ship, Tago Maru, southeast of Formosa, and finished off the stricken ship with gunfire. Steaming north, she torpedoed and sank the passenger ship, Kosei Maru two days later east of Okinawa. Afterwards, she picked up a Japanese soldier, clinging to floating debris, survivor of another sinking. Sargo returned to Pearl Harbor on 9 December 1943, credited with two ships for 15,900 tons; postwar, it was 6,400.

Sargo’s tenth patrol, 26 January to 12 March 1944, was conducted north of the Palau Islands. Despite ULTRA alerting her, she failed to be in position to intercept Admiral Koga when he appeared. Still, she made four attacks and fired all her torpedoes. She sank the transports Nichiro Maru (6,500 tons) on 17 February and Uchide Maru (5,300 tons) on 29 February; this time, the wartime credit, one ship of 7,000 tons, remarkably, increased.

After refit in Pearl Harbor, the veteran submarine departed on her eleventh war patrol on 7 April, along the southern coasts of Kyūshū, Shikoku, and Honshū. On 26 April, she torpedoed and sank the cargo ship Wazan Maru in Kii Suido, approaching Osaka Bay. She returned to Pearl Harbor on 26 May and steamed east to the west coast of the United States for a major overhaul at Mare Island Navy Yard.

Returning to Hawaii in September, Sargo got underway for her 12th patrol on 13 October and operated off the Bonin Islands and Ryukyu Islands. Two trawlers were damaged by Sargo’s three-inch (76 mm) deck gun and machine guns.

On arrival at Majuro Atoll, Marshall Islands, on 7 December 1944, she was assigned to training submarine crews until 13 January 1945, when she proceeded to Eniwetok Atoll. There she acted as a target for ASW training. As the war ended, she returned via Hawaii to the United States, arriving at Mare Island on 27 August. Decommissioned on 22 June 1946, she was stricken from the Naval Vessel Register on 19 July 1946. Her hulk was sold for scrap on 19 May 1947 to the Learner Company of California.

Honors and awards
 Asiatic-Pacific Campaign Medal with eight battle stars for World War II service
 Philippine Presidential Unit Citation (Republic of the Philippines)

Notes

References 

 Blair, Clay, Jr. Silent Victory. Philadelphia: Lippincott, 1975.
 Hinman, Charles R., and Douglas E. Campbell. The Submarine Has No Friends: Friendly Fire Incidents Involving U.S. Submarines During World War II. Syneca Research Group, Inc., 2019. .
 Lenton, H.T. American Submarines. New York: Doubleday & Co., 1973.
 "Sargo Stories" by Bart Bartholomew at SubmarineSailor.com
The Pacific War Online Encyclopedia, Sargo-class article

External links
Historic photos of diesel-powered USS Sargo (SS-188) on Navsource.org, includes photo of SSN-583 during construction viewed by SS-188 crewman
Photos & video of dedication of memorial to the crew of USS Sargo (SS-188) from the crewmen of nuclear-powered USS Sargo (SSN-583) at the National Museum of the Pacific War in Fredericksburg, Texas
The National Museum of the Pacific War - Wikipedia page (includes link to official museum website)
Kill record: USS Sargo

Sargo-class submarines
World War II submarines of the United States
Ships built in Groton, Connecticut
1938 ships
Maritime incidents in March 1942
Friendly fire incidents of World War II